Thomas Lambert (c. 1558 – 7 April 1621), of Hazeley in Hampshire, was an English politician.

Lambert was a Member of Parliament for Southampton in 1601.

References

1550s births
1621 deaths
People from the City of Winchester
English MPs 1601